The 1916 NCAA baseball season, play of college baseball in the United States organized by the National Collegiate Athletic Association (NCAA) began in the spring of 1916.  Play largely consisted of regional matchups, some organized by conferences, and ended in June.  No national championship event was held until 1947.

Conference Changes
The Pacific Coast Conference (a forerunner of the Pac-12 Conference) played its first season of baseball.  Members for the first season included California, Oregon, Oregon State, and Washington.

Conference winners
This is a partial list of conference champions from the 1916 season.

References